Gull Lake is a summer village located on the southern shore of Gull Lake, located approximately southeast of the Town of Rimbey in central Alberta, Canada.

Demographics 

In the 2016 Census of Population conducted by Statistics Canada, the Summer Village of Gull Lake had a population of 176 living in 79 of its 244 total private dwellings, a  change from its 2011 population of 122.

See also 
List of communities in Alberta
List of summer villages in Alberta
List of resort villages in Saskatchewan

References

External links 

1913 establishments in Alberta
Summer villages in Alberta